The Daydreamer is a 1966 stop motion animated–live action musical fantasy film produced by Videocraft International. Directed by Jules Bass, it was written by Arthur Rankin, Jr. and Romeo Muller, based on the stories of Hans Christian Andersen. It features seven original songs by Jules Bass and Maury Laws. The film's opening features the cast in puppet and live form plus caricatures of the cast by Al Hirschfeld. Among the cast were the American actors Paul O'Keefe, Jack Gilford, Ray Bolger and Margaret Hamilton (both from Metro-Goldwyn-Mayer's 1939 classic film The Wizard of Oz), and the Australian actor Cyril Ritchard as the voice of the Sandman. Three of the voice actors: Burl Ives, and Canadian actors Billie Mae Richards and Larry D. Mann, were the voice suppliers for Videocraft's stop motion Christmas television special, Rudolph the Red-Nosed Reindeer (1964). Some of the character voices were recorded at RCA Studios in Toronto, Ontario, under Bernard Cowan's supervision. The "Animagic" puppet sequences were staged by Don Duga at Videocraft in New York, and supervised by Tadahito Mochinaga at MOM Production in Tokyo, Japan.

The film was Videocraft's first theatrical feature production to be distributed by Embassy Pictures, located in Los Angeles, California and headed by executive producer Joseph E. Levine. Embassy Pictures later theatrically releases the company's two other films in 1967, Mad Monster Party? and The Wacky World of Mother Goose. As an association with Rankin and Bass, Ritchard also made his voice appearance in three of their studio's other animated productions: The Enchanted World of Danny Kaye: The Emperor's New Clothes in 1972, The First Christmas: The Story of the First Christmas Snow in 1975, and The Hobbit in 1977 (his final film role shortly before his death).

Plot
A teenaged Hans Christian Andersen, the son of a poor shoemaker, daydreams instead of studying for school. He runs away from home. Whenever he falls asleep, or goes into a daydreaming spell, he dreams that he is in strange adventures with two swindling tailors, a tiny girl no bigger than a thumb, a mermaid, a devil boy in Eden, and others. In reality, as well as in his dreams, Hans is searching for the Garden of Paradise, which he does not find. The dream sequences are puppet animation, complete with a puppet version of himself, as well as with the pie man. Hans gets falsely arrested for poaching by a game warden, and is sent to work chopping wood. His father, who is out looking for Hans, gets falsely arrested, too, by the same game warden, for fishing in protected waters, and is also forced to chop wood, too, where he reunites with his son. Only when the father gives up the ring that he wore on his finger, while he was married in the past, are the father and son released from their labors. These dreams become the basis for his fairy tale fictions, which he writes as an adult: "The Little Mermaid", "Thumbelina", "The Ugly Duckling", "The Emperor's New Clothes", "Little Claus and Big Claus", and "The Garden of Paradise".

Musical numbers
"Daydreamer" – Robert Goulet
"Overture" – Maury Laws
"Wishes and Teardrops" – The Little Mermaid
"Simply Wonderful" – The Emperor and His Three Minstrels
"Who Can Tell" – The Pieman of Odense
"Luck to Sell" – Chris
"Happy Guy" – Thumbelina, Chris and Chorus
"Isn't It Cozy?" – Three Bats and the Mole
"Finale (The Daydreamer)" – Chorus

Cast
Paul O'Keefe as "Chris" (Hans Christian Andersen)
Jack Gilford as Papa Andersen
Margaret Hamilton as Mrs. Klopplebobbler
Sessue Hayakawa as The Mole
Patty Duke as Thumbelina
Boris Karloff as The Rat
Hayley Mills as The Little Mermaid
Burl Ives as Father Neptune
Tallulah Bankhead as The Sea Witch
Victor Borge as The Second Tailor
Ed Wynn as The Emperor
Ray Bolger as The Pieman
Cyril Ritchard as The Sandman
Terry-Thomas as The First Tailor
Robert Harter as Big Claus the game warden

Additional voices
Billie Mae Richards as one of the Little Mermaid's sisters
Larry D. Mann
James Daugherty
William Marine

Crew
Director: Jules Bass
Writer/Producer: Arthur Rankin, Jr.
Executive Producer: Joseph E. Levine
Associate Producer: Larry Roemer
Adaptation from the Stories and Characters: Hans Christian Andersen
Music and Lyrics: Maury Laws and Jules Bass
Live Action Sequence Stager: Ezra Stone
Animagic Sequence Stager: Don Duga
Additional Dialogue: Romeo Muller
Recording Supervisor: Bernard Cowan
Assistant Director: Kizo Nagashima
Live Action Cinematography: Daniel Cavelli
Animagic Technician: Tadahito Mochinaga
Puppet Makers: Ichiro Komuro, Kyoko Kita (both uncredited)
Animation: Fumiko Magari, Hiroshi Tabata (both uncredited)
Emperor's Clothes: Oleg Cassini
Set Design: Maurice Gordon
Makeup: Phyllis Grens
Mobilux Effects: John Hoppe
Optical Effects: Coastal Films, Inc.
Production Manager: Sal Scoppa, Jr.
Choreography: Tony Mordente
Music Composer and Director: Maury Laws
Title Song Orchestration: Don Costa
Sound Recorders: Alan Mirchin, Eric Tomlinson, Peter Rage, Richard Gramaglia

Soundtrack
A soundtrack album was issued by Columbia Records featuring all of the songs and the partial score from the film.  In 2006, the album was reissued on CD by Percepto Records in a limited edition release that included four bonus tracks.

Tales referenced
"Ole Lukøje" (1842)
"The Garden of Paradise" (1839)
"The Little Mermaid" (1837)
"The Ugly Duckling" (1843)
"Thumbelina" (1835)
"The Emperor's New Clothes" (1837)
"Little Claus and Big Claus" (1835)

Home media
The Daydreamer has been released on DVD thrice: on March 4, 2003 and May 13, 2008 by Anchor Bay, and by Lionsgate on March 10, 2012 via Amazon.com as a MOD (Manufacture On Demand) disc. Scorpion Releasing has also announced a Blu-Ray release for 2021.

See also
List of American films of 1966
List of stop-motion films

References

External links

1966 films
1966 animated films
1966 directorial debut films
1960s American films
1960s English-language films
1960s musical fantasy films
1960s stop-motion animated films
American films with live action and animation
American musical fantasy films
Animated musical films
Cultural depictions of Hans Christian Andersen
Embassy Pictures films
Films based on fairy tales
Films based on multiple works
Films based on The Little Mermaid
Films based on The Ugly Duckling
Films based on Thumbelina
Films based on works by Hans Christian Andersen
Films directed by Jules Bass
Films scored by Maury Laws
Films set in Denmark
Films set in the 19th century
Films using stop-motion animation
Films with screenplays by Arthur Rankin Jr.
Films with screenplays by Romeo Muller
Rankin/Bass Productions films
Sandman in film
Works based on The Emperor's New Clothes